The Larceny Act 1861 (24 & 25 Vict c 96) was an Act of the Parliament of the United Kingdom of Great Britain and Ireland (as it then was). It consolidated provisions related to larceny and similar offences from a number of earlier statutes into a single Act. For the most part these provisions were, according to the draftsman of the Act, incorporated with little or no variation in their phraseology. It is one of a group of Acts sometimes referred to as the Criminal Law Consolidation Acts 1861. It was passed with the object of simplifying the law. It is essentially a revised version of an earlier consolidation Act, the Larceny Act 1827  (and the equivalent Irish Act), incorporating subsequent statutes.

England and Wales
This Act was repealed for England and Wales by section 33(3) of, and Part I of Schedule 3 to, the Theft Act 1968.

Republic of Ireland
This Act was retained for the Republic of Ireland by section 2 of and Part 4 of Schedule 1 to, the Statute Law Revision Act 2007. Sections 12, 16, 24 and 25 continue in force.

Provisions

Section 1 - Interpretation of terms

The words from "the term 'trustee'" to "bankruptcy or insolvency", and from "for the purposes of this Act, the night" to "succeeding day" were repealed by section 48(1) of, and the Schedule to, the Larceny Act 1916.

Section 2 - All larcenies to be of the same nature

Davis said that the marginal note to this section ("all larcenies to be of the same nature") was "imperfect" and that this was "obvious".

This section was repealed by section 48(1) of, and the Schedule to, the Larceny Act 1916.

Section 3 - Bailees fraudulently converting property guilty of larceny

This section was repealed by section 48(1) of, and the Schedule to, the Larceny Act 1916.

Section 4 - Punishment for simple larceny

This section was repealed by section 48(1) of, and the Schedule to, the Larceny Act 1916.

Section 5 - Three larcenies within six months may be charged in one indictment

This section was repealed by section 48(1) of, and the Schedule to, the Larceny Act 1916.

Section 6 - Where a single taking is charged and several takings at different times are proved

This section was repealed by section 48(1) of, and the Schedule to, the Larceny Act 1916.

Section 7 - Larceny after a conviction for felony

This section was repealed by section 48(1) of, and the Schedule to, the Larceny Act 1916.

Section 8 - Larceny after conviction of an indictable misdemeanour under this Act

This section was repealed by section 48(1) of, and the Schedule to, the Larceny Act 1916.

Section 9 - Larceny after two summary convictions

This section was repealed by section 48(1) of, and the Schedule to, the Larceny Act 1916.

As to larceny of cattle or other animals

Section 10 - Stealing horses, cows, sheep etc.

This section was repealed by section 48(1) of, and the Schedule to, the Larceny Act 1916.

Section 11 - Killing animals with intent to steal the carcase etc.

This section was repealed by section 48(1) of, and the Schedule to, the Larceny Act 1916.

Section 12 - Stealing deer in an uninclosed part of a forest

Section 13 - Stealing deer in any inclosed ground

Section 14 - Suspected persons found in possession of venison etc. and not satisfactorily accounting for it

Section 15 - Setting engines for taking deer or pulling down park fences

Section 16 - Deer keepers may seize the guns etc. of offenders who, on demand, do not deliver up the same

Section 17 - Killing etc. hares or rabbits in a warren

Section 18 - Stealing dogs

The words from "and whosever" to the end were repealed by section 48(1) of, and the Schedule to, the Larceny Act 1916.

Section 19 - Possession of stolen dogs

The words from "and whosoever" to the end were repealed by section 48(1) of, and the Schedule to, the Larceny Act 1916.

Section 20 - Taking money to restore dogs

This section was repealed by section 48(1) of, and the Schedule to, the Larceny Act 1916.

Section 21 - Stealing beasts or birds ordinarily kept in confinement and not the subject of larceny

Section 22 - Persons found in possession of stolen beasts etc. liable to penalties

Section 23 - Killing pigeons

Section 24 - Taking fish in any water situate in any land belonging to a dwellinghouse or in a private fishery elsewhere

Section 25 - The tackle of fishers may be seized

Section 26 - Stealing or dredging for oysters in oyster fisheries

The words from the beginning of the section to "simple larceny and" were repealed by section 48(1) of, and the Schedule to, the Larceny Act 1916.

As to larceny of written instruments

Section 27 - Bonds, bills, notes etc.

The words "shall steal or" were repealed by section 48(1) of, and the Schedule to, the Larceny Act 1916.

Section 28 - Deeds etc. relating to real property

The words "shall steal or" were repealed by section 48(1) of, and the Schedule to, the Larceny Act 1916.

Section 29 - Testator

Section 30 - Stealing records or other legal documents

The words "shall steal or" were repealed by section 48(1) of, and the Schedule to, the Larceny Act 1916.

As to larceny of things attached to or growing on land

Section 31 - Metal, glass, wood, etc. fixed to house or land

This section was repealed by section 48(1) of, and the Schedule to, the Larceny Act 1916.

Section 32 - Trees in pleasure grounds of the value of 1l or elsewhere of the value of 5l

This section was repealed by section 48(1) of, and the Schedule to, the Larceny Act 1916.

Section 33 - Stealing trees, shrubs etc.

The words from "and whosever having been twice convicted" to the end of the section were repealed by section 48(1) of, and the Schedule to, the Larceny Act 1916.

Section 34 - Stealing etc. any live or dead fence, wooden fence, stile or gate

Section 35 - Suspected persons in possession of wood etc. not satisfactorily accounting for it

Section 36 - Stealing etc. any fruit or vegetable in a garden etc. punishable on summary conviction for first offence

The words from "and whosever" to the end of the section were repealed by section 48(1) of, and the Schedule to, the Larceny Act 1916.

Section 37 - Stealing etc. vegetable productions, not growing in gardens

As to larceny from mines

Section 38 - Ore of metal, coal etc.

This section was repealed by section 48(1) of, and the Schedule to, the Larceny Act 1916.

Section 39 - Miners removing ore with intent to defraud

As to larceny from the person and other like offences

Section 40 - Robbery or stealing from the person

This section was repealed by section 48(1) of, and the Schedule to, the Larceny Act 1916.

Section 41 - On trial for robbery, jury may convict of an assault with intent to rob

This section was repealed by section 48(1) of, and the Schedule to, the Larceny Act 1916.

Section 42 - Assault with intent to rob

This section was repealed by section 48(1) of, and the Schedule to, the Larceny Act 1916.

Section 43 - Robbery or assault by a person armed or by two or more or robbery and wounding

This section was repealed by section 48(1) of, and the Schedule to, the Larceny Act 1916.

Section 44 - Letter demanding money etc. with menaces

This section was repealed by section 48(1) of, and the Schedule to, the Larceny Act 1916.

Section 45 - Demanding money etc. with menaces or by force with intent to steal

This section was repealed by section 48(1) of, and the Schedule to, the Larceny Act 1916.

Section 46 - Letter threatening to accuse of crime with intent to extort

This section was repealed by section 48(1) of, and the Schedule to, the Larceny Act 1916.

Section 47 - Accusing or threatening to accuse with intent to extort

This section was repealed by section 48(1) of, and the Schedule to, the Larceny Act 1916.

Section 48 - Inducing a person by violence or threats to execute deeds etc. with intent to defraud

This section was repealed by section 48(1) of, and the Schedule to, the Larceny Act 1916.

Section 49 - It shall be immaterial from whom the menaces proceed

This section was repealed by section 48(1) of, and the Schedule to, the Larceny Act 1916.

As to sacrilege, burglary and housebreaking

Section 50 - Breaking and entering a church or chapel and committing any felony

See sacrilege.

Section 51 - Burglary by breaking out

This section was repealed by section 48(1) of, and the Schedule to, the Larceny Act 1916.

Section 52 - Burglary

This section was repealed by section 48(1) of, and the Schedule to, the Larceny Act 1916.

Section 53 - What building within the curtailage shall be deemed part of the dwelling-house

This section was repealed by section 48(1) of, and the Schedule to, the Larceny Act 1916.

Section 54 - Entering a dwelling-house in the night with intent to commit any felony

This section was repealed by section 48(1) of, and the Schedule to, the Larceny Act 1916.

Section 55 - Breaking into any building within the curtailage which is no part of the dwelling-house and committing any felony

This section was repealed by section 48(1) of, and the Schedule to, the Larceny Act 1916.

Section 56 - Breaking into any shop, house, warehouse etc., and committing any felony

This section was repealed by section 48(1) of, and the Schedule to, the Larceny Act 1916.

Section 57 - Housebreaking etc. with intent to commit any felony

This section was repealed by section 48(1) of, and the Schedule to, the Larceny Act 1916.

Section 58 - Being armed with intent to break and enter any house in the night

This section was repealed by section 48(1) of, and the Schedule to, the Larceny Act 1916.

Section 59 - The like, after a previous conviction for felony etc.

This section was repealed by section 48(1) of, and the Schedule to, the Larceny Act 1916.

As to larceny in the house

Section 60 - Stealing in a dwelling-house to the value of 5l

This section was repealed by section 48(1) of, and the Schedule to, the Larceny Act 1916.

Section 61 - Stealing in a dwelling-house with menaces

This section was repealed by section 48(1) of, and the Schedule to, the Larceny Act 1916.

As to larceny in manufactories

Section 62 - Stealing goods in the process of manufacture

This section was repealed by section 48(1) of, and the Schedule to, the Larceny Act 1916.

As to larceny in ships, wharfs etc

Section 63 - Stealing from ships, docks, wharfs, etc.

This section was repealed by section 48(1) of, and the Schedule to, the Larceny Act 1916.

Section 64 - Stealing from a ship in distress or wrecked

This section was repealed by section 48(1) of, and the Schedule to, the Larceny Act 1916.

Section 65 - Persons in possession of shipwrecked goods not giving a satisfactory account

Section 66 - If any person offers shipwrecked goods for sale, the goods may be seized, etc.

As to larceny or embezzlement by clerks, servants or persons in the public service

Section 67 - Larceny by clerks or servants

Section 68 - Embezzlement by clerks or servants

Section 69 - Larceny by persons in the Queen's service, or by the police

Section 70 - Embezzlement by persons in the Queen's service, or by the police

Section 71 - Distinct acts of embezzlement may be charged in the same indictment

Section 72 - Persons indicted for embezzlement as a clerk etc., not to be acquitted if the offence turn out to be larceny and vice versa

Section 73 - Ebezzlement by officers of the Bank of England or Ireland

As to larceny by tenants or lodgers

Section 74 - Tenant or lodger stealing chattel or fixture let to hire with house or lodgings

As to frauds by agents, bankers or factors

Section 75 - Agent, banker etc., embezzling money or selling securities etc., entrusted to him

Section 76 - Bankers etc. fraudulently selling etc. property entrusted to their care

Section 77 - Persons under powers of attorney fraudulently selling property

This section was repealed by section 48(1) of, and the Schedule to, the Larceny Act 1916.

Section 78 - Factors obtaining advances on the property of their principals

This section was repealed by section 48(1) of, and the Schedule to, the Larceny Act 1916.

Section 79 - Definitions of terms

This section was repealed by section 48(1) of, and the Schedule to, the Larceny Act 1916.

Section 80 - Trustees fraudulently disposing of property, guilty of a misdemeanour

This section was repealed by section 48(1) of, and the Schedule to, the Larceny Act 1916.

Section 81 - Directors etc. of any body corporate or public company fraudulently appropriating property

This section was repealed by section 48(1) of, and the Schedule to, the Larceny Act 1916.

Section 82 - Or keeping fraudulent accounts

Section 83 - Or wilfully destroying books, etc.

Section 84 - Or publishing fraudulent statements

Section 85 - No person to be exempt from answering questions in any court, but no person making a disclosure in any compulsory proceeding to be liable to prosecution

Section 86 - No remedy at law or in equity shall be affected

Section 87 - Certain misdemeanours not triable at sessions

As to obtaining money etc by false pretences
Section 88 - False pretences

This section was repealed by section 48(1) of, and the Schedule to, the Larceny Act 1916.

Section 89 - Where money or thing is caused to be paid or delivered to any person other than the person making a false pretence

This section was repealed by section 48(1) of, and the Schedule to, the Larceny Act 1916.

Section 90 - Inducing persons by fraud to execute deeds and other instruments

This section was repealed by section 48(1) of, and the Schedule to, the Larceny Act 1916.

As to receiving stolen goods

Section 91 - Receiving, where the principal is guilty of felony

This section was repealed by section 48(1) of, and the Schedule to, the Larceny Act 1916.

Section 92 - Indictment for stealing and receiving

This section was repealed by section 48(1) of, and the Schedule to, the Larceny Act 1916.

Section 93 - Separate receivers may be included in the same indictment in the absence of a principal

This section was repealed by section 48(1) of, and the Schedule to, the Larceny Act 1916.

Section 94 - On an indictment for jointly receiving, persons may be convicted of separately receiving

This section was repealed by section 48(1) of, and the Schedule to, the Larceny Act 1916.

Section 95 - Receiving, where the principal has been guilty of a misdemeanour

This section was repealed by section 48(1) of, and the Schedule to, the Larceny Act 1916.

Section 96 - Receiver where triable

This section was repealed by section 48(1) of, and the Schedule to, the Larceny Act 1916.

Section 97 - Receivers of property, where the original offence is punishable on summary conviction

Section 98 - Principals in the second degree and accessories

The words "except only a receiver of stolen property" were repealed by section 48(1) of, and the Schedule to, the Larceny Act 1916.

Section 99 - Abettors in offences punishable on summary conviction

As to restitution and recovery of stolen property

Section 100 - The owner of stolen property prosecuting thief or receiver to conviction shall have restitution of his property

This section was repealed by section 48(1) of, and the Schedule to, the Larceny Act 1916.

Section 101 - Taking a reward for helping to the recovery of stolen property without bringing the offender to trial

This section was repealed by section 48(1) of, and the Schedule to, the Larceny Act 1916.

Section 102 - Advertising a reward for the return of stolen property etc.

Provision was made in relation to this section by sections 3 and 4 of the Larceny (Advertisements) Act 1870 and by the Common Informers Act 1951.

This section is replaced for England and Wales by section 23 of the Theft Act 1968.

As to the apprehension of offenders and other proceedings

Section 103 - A person in the act of committing any offence may be apprehended without warrant

Section 104 - A person loitering at night and suspected of any felony against this Act may be apprehended

Section 105 - Mode of compelling the appearance of persons punishable on summary conviction

Section 106 - Application of forfeitures and penalties on summary convictionsSection 107 - If a person summarily convicted shall not pay etc., the Justice may commit himSection 108 - Justice may discharge the offender in certain circumstancesSection 109 - A summary conviction shall be a bar to any other proceeding for the same cause Section 110 - AppealSection 111 - No certiorari etc.Section 112 - Convictions to be returned to the Quarter SessionsSection 113 - Venue, in proceedings against persons acting under this ActSection 114 - Stealers of property in one part of the United Kingdom who have the same in any other part of the United Kingdom may be tried and punished in that part of the United Kingdom where they have the propertyThis section was repealed by section 48(1) of, and the Schedule to, the Larceny Act 1916.Section 115 - Offences committed within the jurisdiction of the AdmiraltySection 116 - Form of indictment for a subsequent offenceSection 117 - Fine, and sureties for keeping the peace; in what casesSection 118 - Hard labourSection 119 - Solitary confinement and whippingSection 120 - Summary proceedings may be under the 11 & 12 Vict c 43 and in Ireland under 14 & 15 Vict c 93Section 121 - The costs of the prosecutions of misdemeanors against this Act may be allowedSection 122 - Act not to extend to ScotlandSection 123 - Commencement of this Act'''

See also
Larceny Act

References
James Edward Davis, The Criminal Law Consolidation Statutes of the 24 & 25 of Victoria, Chapters 94 to 100: Edited with Notes, Critical and Explanatory, Butterworths, 1861, pp. v - xviii (introduction)  and pp. 20 to 118 (complete annotated text of the Act)  (from Google Books).
List of repeals and amendments in the Republic of Ireland from the Irish Statute Book.

External links

United Kingdom Acts of Parliament 1861